Shallowford is a hamlet in the civil parish of Lynton and Lynmouth in the North Devon district of Devon, England.

 

Hamlets in Devon